The Argimusco is a high plateau situated just north of Mount Etna in Sicily, southern Italy, between the Nebrodi and Peloritani Mountains. It lies within the boundaries of the communes of Montalbano Elicona, Tripi (which is built on the site of the ancient Abaca Enum) and Roccella Valdemone. The site offer a wide panorama of the volcano Etna, the Aeolian Islands, the mountains Rocca Salvatesta and Montagna di Vernà, cape Tindari, cape Calavà and cape Milazzo.

The rocks
Local tradition holds that the ancient menhirs and the dolmens are megaliths from a prehistoric population. It is generally considered that these are being produced by wind erosion.

Amongst the megaliths, around Portella Cerasa, stand two large elongated boulders, while another megalith incised with a symbol of the Sun. Further west, at Portella Zilla, a rustic building enclosed the remains of a dolmen with a huge boulder in front, which may be the remains of a fallen menhir. No signs of prehistoric man's presence, such as pottery, tools or bones, are found around the presumed monuments.

The Mirror of the Stars Theory

Argimusco is called "The Mirror of the Stars", it's  situated just north of Mt. Etna, but is also site of shaped megalithic rock structures. The site has been categorized as being geomantically significant and has drawn esoteric and occult practitioners throughout the centuries.
Argimusco also has ten stone statues that are supposed to represent the constellations present in the summer sky.

The Eagle
The Eagle is formed by the overlapping of blocks from the pentagonal faces. The megalith is a bird of prey, with wings half-spread and the head facing south. The eagle in hermetic symbolism is a privileged being which connects earth with heaven. It is the symbol of the soul of the deceased. The latter after the death of material life is born to new life (like the alchemical phoenix rising from the ashes, the soul rises from the alchemical ashes). In the background of the Aquila, stands Mount Nettuno (Rocca Salvatesta) that probably in the economy of the site acts as solstice or equinox indicator.

The Alchemical symbols
On Argimusco the statues of the Pelican, the Owl and finally a rock that resembles the alchemical alembic have been found.

The profile of Asclepius
On the wall facing west, you notice the haughty profile of a young man who looks with his face upwards to the setting sun. The dual representation suggests the chthonic Italian deity of Janus, then adopted in Roman religion, to whom is dedicated the month of starting of the year.  With it were measured various passages of the sun on the solstices on the north-south diagonal. In fact, the Great Cliff of Janus plays a central role in any relationship north (Aeolian Islands) and south (Etna).

Virgo (constellation)
If we with a look towards the west, we can admire the incredible precision, almost "portrait", of the megalith of the ‘Praying Woman’ or ‘Virgo". It is a mysterious androgynous figure twenty-six meters high with her hands clasped in prayer. You notice the elbow, the mantle, the knee, the Phrygian cap on the head, and even the pedestal base.

Ritual ablution
The Virgin is the center of the "Mirror of the stars" staged at Argimusco, since all other figures play an ancillary role with respect to it. As a matter of fact, the sun rises in Virgo at summer solstice of 10,500 BC. It embodies the feminine divine figure, which is lunar liquid mercury, as opposed to the divine Apollonian, masculine, solar disk, put in alchemical terms. As a mercurial element, it is precisely located near the Serpens constellation and the bearer of snakes (Ophiuchus), or the symbol of the Caduceus of Hermes (Mercury) consisting of a rod around which wraps themselves, in fact, two snakes (now the symbol of medicine). Particularly significant, high on the megalith of the Virgo is a rectangular pool, that we suppose was used for ritual ablutions.

Tetragrammathon and Sexstant
On Argimusco there is a Templar tetragram and a stone sextant. The sextant was to serve, according to medieval astrological medical techniques, for the purpose of diagnostic and therapeutic use in association with the Sphere of Pythagoras and the astrolabe.

Corvus  Constellation (Igino - De Astronomia) - megalithic statuein Saba style for the astral medicine applications practiced by Arnau de Vilanova. The model was, probably, drawn from Al Sufi's Liber locis stellarum fixarum of 964. Camillo Leonardi in  Speculum Lapidum, 1502 : "Corvus his cognitis vociferare incipiet: a longeque volabit ad hunc lapidem inveniendum: & invento ad nidum accedet: tactisque ovis ut cruda ac prolifica redibunt. Surripiatur lapis subito a nido. Cuius virtus est divitias augere, honores praebere ac multa futura praedicere".

Leo Arnau de Villanova in De Sigillis : "Sigillum est leonis: XI die ante kalendas augusti accipe aurum et fac inde sigillum ut superius. Et sculpetur in eo forma Leonis(...) et dum mallio ferietur dicas: exurge Leo de tribus Judas et intende iudicio meo, deus meus in causam meam". Postea dicatur Psalmus: "Iudica me deus et discerne causam mea."

Cygnus Constellation (Igino - De Astronomia) - megalithic statuein Saba style for astral medicine applications practiced by Arnau de Vilanova. The model was probably from Liber locis stellarumAl Sufi fixarum of 964 The statue represented is with open wings, for obvious static reasons. Arnoldus Saxo in "Liber de Floridus: "Si sinveneris in quo sit Signum (Sc. Cygnum) quod preest Aquario, ille lapis procul dubio te liberabit a paralisi et a febre quartana".

Sagitta  Constellation (Igino - De Astronomia) - megalithic statue in Saba style for the astral medicine applications practiced by Arnau de Vilanova. The model was, probably, drawn from Al Sufi's Liber locis stellarum fixarum of 964. Sigillum est Sagittarii: die ergo 15 precedente Kalendas decembris accipiatur aurum purum et fiat inde sigillum rotundum et dum percuties cum malleo dicas «Exurge domme Jhesu Chnste in occursum meum et vide tu domine deus virtutum deus Israel». Psalmus «Eripe me domine de inimicis meis» et sculpetur in eo figura Sagittarii et dum Sol est in eo et in circumferentia Sagittari figuretur «Scharphiel, sanctus spiritus, sanctus Iudas» et in circumferentia alterius partis fit «Jhesus autem tran siens per medium illorum ibat». Et in medio "Sabaoh athanatos". Valet autem in generali epileticis et demoniacis et maniacis et arteticis et sciaticis et contra febrem de colera putrefacta et ad multa alia.

Snake Constellation (Igino - De Astronomia) - megalithic statue in Saba style for the astral medicine applications practiced by Arnau de Vilanova. The model was probably taken from the Liber locis stellarum fixarum of Al Sufi of 964 (15th century manuscript in deposit at the Forschung Bibliothek of Gotha in Germany Pergamenthandschrift M II 141, one of the numerous editions of the Liber locis stellarum fixarum that Al Sufi wrote in 964 to translate the Almagest of Ptolemy from the Greek)

Crater Constellation (Igino - De Astronomia) - megalithic statuein Saba style for astral medicine applications practiced by Arnau de Vilanova.

Idra Constellation (Igino - De Astronomia) - megalithic statue in Saba style for the astral medicine applications practiced by Arnau de Vilanova. The model was probably taken from the Liber locis stellarum fixarum of Al Sufi of 964 (15th century manuscript in deposit at the Forschung Bibliothek of Gotha in Germany Pergamenthandschrift M II 141, one of the numerous editions of the Fixarum that Al Sufi wrote in 964 to translate Tolomeo's Almagest from the Greek)

Ofiuscus Constellation (Igino - De Astronomia) - megalithic statue in Saba style for the astral medicine applications practiced by Arnau de Vilanova. The model was probably taken from the Liber locis stellarum fixarum of Al Sufi of 964 (15th century manuscript in deposit at the Forschung Bibliothek of Gotha in Germany Pergamenthandschrift M II 141, one of the numerous editions of the Fixarum that Al Sufi wrote in 964 to translate Tolomeo's Almagest from the Greek)

Gallery

References

Sources

See also
 Pareidolia

External links

Landmarks in Sicily
Landforms of Sicily
Plateaus of Italy